Nicolás Almagro defeated Gilles Simon 6-2, 6-3 to win the 2006 Open de Tenis Comunidad Valenciana singles event.

Seeds

Draws

Key
Q - Qualifier
WC - Wildcard
LL - Lucky loser
r - Retired

Finals

Section 1

Section 2

External links
 Singles draw
 Qualifying draw

Singles